In the fall of 1805 a small naval squadron under the orders of Commodore Sir Home Popham escorted a fleet of transports and East Indiamen carrying some 5000 soldiers under the command of Major-general Sir David Baird to attack the Dutch at the Cape of Good Hope. The fleet assembled at Madeira and touched at St. Salvador to replenish supplies. The expedition sailed again on the 26 November, and on 4 January 1806, in the evening, anchored to the west of Robben Island, preparatory to taking the Dutch colony.  

The lists below are those that Commodore Home Riggs Popham provided to William Marsden, First Secretary of the Admiralty.

Vessels sailing for the British East India Company
These vessels were carrying the 59th Regiment of Foot and recruits for various regiments in India. After the capture of the Cape these vessels sailed on to India or China.

 – lost on the expedition

After the Dutch Governor Jansens signed a capitulation on 18 January 1806, and the British established control of the Cape Colony,  escorted William Pitt, Jane Dutchess of Gordon, Sir William Pulteney, and Comet to Madras. The convoy included Northampton, Streatham, Europe, Union, Glory, and Sarah Christiana.

Transports
Apart from the EIC vessels, the expedition employed a large number of transports specifically for the expedition. These vessels carried the 93rd, 38th, and 24th Regiments of Foot, the Royal Artillery, and dismounted dragoons. The data on burthens and post-invasion disposition comes from Theal.

The 17 vessels in this table and the next with "†" by their name sailed back to Great Britain in convoy under escort by now HMS Volontaire.
The seven vessels with "‡" by their name sailed as cartels, repatriating to Holland the Dutch troops captured at the Cape, and their dependents.

Other

Citations

References
 

Age of Sail merchant ships of England
Lists of sailing ships
Lists of ships of the United Kingdom